Sir Henry Beaumont, 2nd Baronet (2 April 1638 – 27 January 1689) was an English politician.

He was the oldest son of Sir Thomas Beaumont, 1st Baronet and Elizabeth Trott, daughter of Sir Nicholas Trott, and was baptised at Stoughton Grange. Beaumont was educated at St John's College, Oxford and succeeded his father as baronet in 1676. He sat as a Member of Parliament (MP) for Leicester between 1679 and 1689.

On 2 April 1662, he married Elizabeth Farmer, daughter of George Farmer, at St Andrew's Church, Holborn. They had seven daughters and fourteen sons (six having died as infants). Beaumont was buried at Stoughton, Leicestershire and was succeeded in the baronetcy successively by his sons Thomas, George and Lewis.

References

1638 births
1689 deaths
Alumni of St John's College, Oxford
Baronets in the Baronetage of England
English MPs 1679
English MPs 1680–1681
English MPs 1681
English MPs 1685–1687
People from Stoughton, Leicestershire